Reflection was an album recorded in 1971 by folk-rock band Pentangle.

The album was recorded over a three-week period in March 1971, at a time when the tensions between the band members were high. Different band members were continually threatening to leave and attendance by Jansch and Renbourn at the recording sessions was dependent on their state of sobriety.

Reception

Allmusic highly praised the album in their retrospective review, calling the most attention to Jansch and Renbourn's acoustic guitar duets and McShee's vocals. They singled out "Wedding Dress" ("a fabulous meeting of Celtic, country, and, believe it or not, funk") and "Will the Circle Be Unbroken" ("the group was further exploring new musical ground, this time with traditional American folk/gospel") as especially strong tracks.

Track listing
All songs written by Terry Cox, Bert Jansch, Jacqui McShee, John Renbourn, and Danny Thompson, except where noted.

Release history
Reflection was released in 1971 in the UK as Transatlantic TRA24O. The U.S. release, also in 1971, was Reprise R56463.

Personnel
Pentangle
 Terry Cox – drums, percussion,  vocals
 Bert Jansch – acoustic guitar,  banjo, vocals
 Jacqui McShee – vocals
 John Renbourn – acoustic guitar, electric guitar, vocals
 Danny Thompson – double bass

References

1971 albums
Pentangle (band) albums
Albums produced by Bill Leader
Transatlantic Records albums
Albums recorded at Olympic Sound Studios